GNOME SoundConverter is an unofficial GNOME-based free and open-source transcoder for digital audio files. It uses GStreamer for input and output files. It has multi threaded design and can also extract the audio from video files.

From many years ago, it is available in the repositories of many Linux distributions included Debian, Fedora, openSUSE, Ubuntu, Gentoo and Arch Linux.

Features
 Change filenames based on custom pattern or predefined patterns
 Create folder according to tags or selected location
 Can delete original file
 Adjust bitrate
 Importing the all metadata including image from original file

See also

 OggConvert
 List of Linux audio software
 Comparison of free software for audio

References

External links

 

2004 software
Audio software for Linux
Audio software that uses GTK
Free audio software
Free software programmed in Python
Software that uses GStreamer